WJNV is a Country-formatted broadcast radio station licensed to Jonesville, Virginia, serving Jonesville and Pennington Gap in Virginia and Sneedville in Tennessee. WJNV is owned and operated by Regina Kay Moore.

References

External links
 

2000 establishments in Virginia
Country radio stations in the United States
Radio stations established in 2000
JNV